Tennet may refer to:

 Tennet people, an ethnic group in South Sudan
 Tennet language, the language of the Tennet people
 TenneT, the national electricity transmission system operator of the Netherlands, and in parts of Germany

See also
 Tenet (disambiguation)
 Tenneti (disambiguation)

Language and nationality disambiguation pages